Keradere is a genus of snout moths. It was described by Whalley in 1970.

Species
 Keradere lepidella (Ragonot, 1887)
 Keradere noctivaga (Staudinger, 1879)
 Keradere tengstroemiella (Erschoff, 1874)

References

Phycitini
Pyralidae genera